The National Roller Hockey League (NRHL) is an inline hockey league based in the United States. The league was established in 2014, and played two seasons from 2015–2016 before going on hiatus for three years, and then announcing a return in 2020 with 4 different teams. The league has not announced anything since 2020 and as of today has continued to be on hiatus.

History

First seasons (2015–2016)
Founded in late 2014, the NRHL began its inaugural season on February 20, 2015. Four teams (Alkali Revive, Alkali Surge, Canfield Chiefs and Detroit Bordercats) played a 12-game regular season followed by playoffs. Following an undefeated regular season, the Detroit Bordercats needed three games to eliminate Alkali Revive to advance to the Commissioners Cup Finals where they swept the best-of three series against Alkali Surge. Kyle Siciliano was named playoffs MVP.

NRHL switched to a winter schedule for its second season, which begin on December 18, 2015. Returning to defend their title was the Detroit Bordercats along with a rebranded Motor City Revive and Shelby Surge. The Canfield Chiefs franchise was replaced by the Detroit Stars. The Bordercats would continue their regular season undefeated streak until February 13, 2016 when the Stars handed them their first loss. On April 10, 2016 the Bordercats would exact some revenge, sweeping the Stars in two-straight games to capture their second NRHL Commissioners Cup.

After two seasons NRHL went dormant as the administration developed a strategic plan to move forward as a national league.

Return to play (2020)
There were plans to return in 2020 with a summer season running May through August.
With a national league in mind, St. Louis Vipers were announced as an expansion franchise in August 2018. Port Huron was the next city announced by NRHL. The Detroit Dragons and Grand Rapids Warthogs have also been announced. As of summer 2021 there has been no league announcements or activity in over a year.

Teams

Past teams 
 Canfield Chiefs (2015)
 Detroit Bordercats (2015–16)
 Detroit Stars (2016)
 Motor City Revive (2015–16)
 Shelby Surge (2015–16)

Champions

Awards

References

External links
 National Roller Hockey League website

Sports leagues in the United States
Sports organizations established in 2015
1